Kęstutis Skučas (born 27 August 1967) is a Lithuanian Paralympic athlete who competes in international elite track and field competitions in wheelchair racing and occasionally discus throw and a former Paralympic swimmer. He is a European champion in the 400m and is also a European bronze medalist in the discus throw. Skučas is a double World silver medalist and Paralympic silver medalist in backstroke swimming.

Skučas joined the Soviet military after he had left high school aged nineteen. He was sent to Arkhangelsk Oblast, Russia and while he served there, he developed inflammation in his spinal cord and sharp back pain attributed to the cold temperatures which often dropped to -40 Celsius. Medics told Skučas that he had developed a tumour in his spinal cord and was taken to emergency surgery in Saint Petersburg which proved unsuccessful as he had lost feeling below his armpits.

References

1967 births
Living people
Sportspeople from Kaunas
Paralympic wheelchair racers
Lithuanian wheelchair racers
Paralympic athletes of Lithuania
Paralympic swimmers of Lithuania
Lithuanian male discus throwers
Lithuanian male backstroke swimmers
Swimmers at the 2000 Summer Paralympics
Swimmers at the 2004 Summer Paralympics
Swimmers at the 2008 Summer Paralympics
Swimmers at the 2012 Summer Paralympics
Athletes (track and field) at the 2016 Summer Paralympics
Medalists at the 2004 Summer Paralympics
Medalists at the World Para Swimming Championships
Medalists at the World Para Athletics European Championships
S4-classified Paralympic swimmers